This is a list of British Army commands and army groups. It is intended as a central point of access information about British formations of that size.

Aldershot Command (until 1941)
Anti-Aircraft Command
Army Headquarters (from 1 November 2011) (see Commander Land Forces)
Army Strategic Command (1968–1972)
British Army of the Rhine (1945–1994)
British Element Trieste Force (BETFOR)
British Expeditionary Force (World War I)
British Expeditionary Force (World War II)
British Forces in Austria (ex Eighth Army)
Cyrenaica Command (1940–1941)
East Africa Command (1941–1964)
Eastern Command
Far East Land Forces
Field Army (c.2015-present)
Home Command
British India Command
Land Command (1995–2008)
Land Forces (2008–2011)
Malaya Command
HQ Malta and Libya (until at least 1967)
Middle East Command (1939–1945)
Middle East Land Forces, (1945-1976)
Near East Land Forces
Netherlands East Indies Command (c.1946-1947)
Northern Command
HQ Northern Ireland
Persia and Iraq Command
Scottish Command
South Eastern Command (1941–1944)
Southern Command (until 1972)
UK Land Forces (1972–1995)
UK Support Command (Germany) (see British Forces Germany)
West Africa Command (1941–1956)
Western Command

Army Groups
 11th Army Group Activated in November 1943. On 12 November 1944 redesignated Allied Land Forces South East Asia
 15th Army Group
 18th Army Group
 21st Army Group
 Allied Armies in Italy

References

Lists of military units and formations of World War II
Commands And Army Groups
 
Commands
Commands And Army Groups
Commands and Army groupes